The Guardian-class radar picket ships were a class of ocean radar picket ships (YAGR, later AGR), converted 1954–1958 from World War II Liberty ships acquired by the U.S. Navy. Their task was to act as part of the radar defenses of the United States in the Cold War, serving until 1965.

Ship type
The converted Liberty ships were typically the boxed aircraft transport version, type Z-EC2-S-C5. The hull classification symbol of the ships was initially YAGR, changed to AGR in 1958: originally the District Auxiliary, Miscellaneous (YAG) classification with hull numbers YAG-41 through YAG-44 for the first four ships was considered, but this symbol was not adopted.

Equipment
As converted, each ship carried an AN/SPS-8 height finding radar, AN/SPS-12 air/surface search radar, AN/SPS-17 long range air search radar, and AN/UPA-22 IFF sensor. The AN/SPS-8 was later replaced on some ships by the AN/SPS-30.

Service
The AGRs were based on both coasts at Newport, Rhode Island (later Davisville, Rhode Island) and Treasure Island, California near San Francisco, eight on the East Coast and eight on the West Coast. They would spend 30–45 days at sea regardless of weather, alternating with 15 days in port, monitoring aircraft approaching the United States in the Contiguous Radar Coverage System, an adjunct to the Distant Early Warning line under the Continental Air Defense Command. Their primary duty was to warn of a surprise Soviet bomber attack. The DERs and Navy WV-2s were called Barrier Forces, BarLant and BarPac, and operated much further from the US than the AGRs; the Air Force EC-121s operated in "Contiguous Barrier" orbits between the coasts and the AGRs. By 1965, the development of over-the-horizon radar had superseded their function, and the radar picket ships were decommissioned and scrapped by the early 1970s.

The ships were:
 Atlantic Squadron
 USS Guardian (YAGR-1)
 USS Lookout (YAGR-2)
 USS Skywatcher (AGR-3) 
 USS Searcher (AGR-4)
 USS Investigator (AGR-9)
 USS Outpost (AGR-10) 
 USS Protector (ARG-11) 
 USS Vigil (AGR-12)
 Pacific Squadron
 USS Scanner (AGR-5)
 USS Locator (AGR-6)
 USS Picket (YAGR-7)
 USS Interceptor (AGR-8)
 USS Interdictor (AGR-13)
 USS Interpreter (AGR-14)
 USS Tracer (AGR-15)
 USS Watchman (AGR-16)

While on station, the ships' operational control shifted from the Navy to the Air Force and NORAD. While on station, each ship stayed within a specific radius of its assigned picket station, reporting and tracking all aircraft contacts. Each ship carried qualified air controllers to direct intercept aircraft sent out to engage contacts. While on station other duties such as search and rescue, weather reporting, and miscellaneous duties were assigned. The National Marine Fisheries Service even provided fishing gear so that the crew could fish for tuna during the season, and the ships sent daily reports of fish caught for research purposes.

The Guardian class spent more time at sea than any other U.S. Navy vessels, apart from ballistic missile submarines, averaging 220–250 days per year on patrol. To make this very high amount of sea time as comfortable as possible for the crew, all sleeping quarters were air conditioned, each officer had a private stateroom, petty officers shared two-man cabins and enlisted men slept in four-man cabins (most other USN enlisted men at the time slept in hammocks, and in large berthing compartments regardless of type of bed).

References

 Friedman, Norman US Destroyers: An Illustrated Design History (Revised Edition), Naval Institute Press, Annapolis:2004, .

}

Liberty ships
World War II merchant ships of the United States
 
Cold War auxiliary ships of the United States